In telecommunication, a bipolar signal is a signal that may assume either of two polarities, neither of which is zero.  

A bipolar signal may have a two-state non-return-to-zero (NRZ) or a three-state return-to-zero (RZ) binary coding scheme. 

A bipolar signal is usually symmetrical with respect to zero amplitude, i.e., the absolute values of the positive and negative signal states are nominally equal.

Telecommunication theory